H. E. Eduardo Jiménez de Aréchaga (8 June 1918 – 5 April 1994) was a Uruguayan jurist. Professor of Public International Law in the Universidad de la República (National University) School of Law and in the Law School of the Catholic University of Uruguay (Universidad Católica del Uruguay). Among other writings, he wrote the chapter on State Responsibility in Max Sorensen's Manual of Public International Law.

Jiménez de Aréchaga held a seat on the United Nations' International Law Commission from 1960 to 1969. He was the president of the ad hoc court of arbitration that was established by Canada and France to decide the 1992 Canada–France Maritime Boundary Case. He was also President of the arbitral tribunal for the "Rainbow Warrior" case between New Zealand and France (1989-1990).

He then served as a judge on the International Court of Justice (ICJ or "World Court") between 1970 and 1979, including a period as President of the ICJ from 1976 to 1979.

He died in a car accident in Punta del Este, Uruguay, in 1994. The Eduardo Jiménez de Aréchaga Moot Court Competition is named on his honor and gathers students and lawyers from all around Latin America to discuss a case within the framework of the Inter-American Court of Human Rights.

1918 births
1994 deaths
Interior ministers of Uruguay
University of the Republic (Uruguay) alumni
Academic staff of the University of the Republic (Uruguay)
International law scholars
Road incident deaths in Uruguay
Presidents of the International Court of Justice
Uruguayan judges
International Law Commission officials
Uruguayan judges of United Nations courts and tribunals
Members of the International Law Commission